The culture of Brunei is strongly influenced by Malay cultures and the Islam. The culture is also influenced by the demographic makeup of the country: more than two-thirds of the population are Malay, and the remainder consists of Chinese, Indians and indigenous groups such as Muruts, Dusuns and Kedayans. While Standard Malay is the official language of Brunei, languages such as Brunei Malay and English are more commonly spoken.

Islam is the official religion of Brunei and Brunei has implemented Sharia law since 2014.

Language

Standard Malay, the language spoken by the ethnic Malays, who make up over 65% of Brunei's population, is the official language of Brunei. However, the most widely spoken language in Brunei is Brunei Malay, which differs greatly from Standard Malay in areas like pronunciation, lexis and syntax. In addition, there are many other Malay dialects spoken by indigenous communities, such as Dayak and Iban. Usage of such Malay dialects has been on the decline due to assimilation of such ethnic culture with the mainstream culture; some varieties of these dialects are at risk of becoming extinct.

English language is also used in Brunei. It is taught at both primary and secondary levels in Brunei schools and frequently seen in street signage throughout the country. Mandarin Chinese, the language used by the sizable minority Chinese community, is widely used as well. Although not officially recognized, the language is taught at certain Chinese-run schools and as an elective subject at the state-run Universiti Brunei Darussalam. Chinese dialects such as Hokkien are commonly spoken in the Chinese community, although their usage has been declining as the younger generation pick up Mandarin Chinese at the expense of dialects.

Arts

Religion

Islam is the official religion of Brunei; Muslims make up over 78% of the population. The Constitution of Brunei states that "The religion of Brunei Darussalam shall be the Muslim religion according to the Shafi'i sect of that religion", although it also guarantees religious freedom, albeit with restrictions. The ruling monarch is depicted as the defender of Islam in the country under a system known as Malay 
Islamic Monarchy, while the state's Ministry of Religious Affairs officially promotes Islam in Brunei.

In 2014, Brunei controversially adopted Sharia law, becoming the first East Asian country to do so. These laws applies to non-Muslims in the country and has been criticized by international organisations such as the United Nations and Amnesty International. Prior to the introduction of Sharia law, Brunei has already adopted religiously motivated laws such as the prohibition of the sales of alcohol in the country.

Christians and Buddhists make up the largest proportion of non-Muslims in Brunei. There are several Christian churches, Chinese Buddhist or Daoist temples and Hindu temple, but these non-Muslim places of worship are not allowed to display visible signs of their religion outside of their premises. These religions are not permitted to proselytize or to try and convert others into their faith. A Non-Muslim woman marrying a Muslim is required by law to convert into Islam.

Cuisine

Sports

Football is an extremely popular sport in Brunei.

Brunei athletes has competed on the world stage in competitions such as the Olympic Games, Commonwealth Games and South East Asian Games. In the 1996, 2000 and 2004 Olympic Games, Brunei sent a single competing athlete, while at the 2012 London Olympic Games, it sent two athletes, including its first female Olympic representative. Although it has sent athletes to the Commonwealth Games since the 1990 edition, Brunei athletes has yet to win any medals at these Games. Brunei has hosted the 1999 Southeast Asian Games.

Symbols, flags and emblems

See also
 Malay culture
 People of Brunei
 Prostitution in Brunei
 Public holidays in Brunei

References

External links
 Ministry of Culture, Youth and Sports, Brunei 
 Brunei Culture on Asian- China Centre
 Culture and Tradition on Brudirect.com

Bruneian culture